Sam Burke is a former West Indies cricket umpire. He stood in three Test matches between 1935 and 1953.

See also
 List of Test cricket umpires

References

Year of birth missing (living people)
Possibly living people
Place of birth missing (living people)
West Indian Test cricket umpires